In cricket, a five-wicket haul (also known as a fifer or five-for), refers to a bowler taking five or more wickets in a single innings. Trent Boult, a New Zealand cricketer, has taken 15 five-wicket hauls during his international cricket, teb in Test cricket and five in One Day International matches (ODIs). Boult has also played for New Zealand in Twenty20 International (T20I) cricket.

Boult is a left-arm fast-medium bowler, who is notable for his ability to swing the ball both ways. He is one of 36 players to have taken 300 or more wickets in Test cricket and has been ranked consistently towards the top of the ICC Men's ODI Player Rankings. He made his international debut for New Zealand on 9 December 2011 against Australia in the second Test of New Zealand's 2011 tour of Australia, taking four wickets in the match. 

Boult's first five-wicket haul was against England, during the third Test of England's 2012–13 tour of New Zealand; he took six wickets for  the cost of 68 runs (6/68) during England's first innings. His career best Test match bowling analysis came against Sri Lanka with 6/30 taken during Sri Lanka's 2018–2019 tour of New Zealand.

Boult's first ODI five-wicket haul was taken against Australia, during the 2015 Cricket World Cup. He took five wickets for 27 runs in a group stage match. With five individual five-wicket hauls, Boult is equal for eighth place for the most five-wickets taken in an ODI. His seven wickets for 34 against the West Indies are the eighth best figures taken in men's ODI cricket and the second best taken for New Zealand after Tim Southee's 7/33.

Test match five-wicket hauls 
Boult has taken five-wickets in an innings in a Test match ten times.

One Day International five-wicket hauls
Boult has taken five-wicket hauls in five One Day International matches.

Notes

References

Boult, Trent
Boult,5-wicket